Donovan Demian Lucien Deekman (born 23 June 1988) is a Dutch professional footballer who plays for Maldivian side Club Eagles as a striker.

Club career
Born in Amsterdam, Deekman has played for Heerenveen, Lokeren, Sparta Rotterdam, Concordia Chiajna and Naft Tehran.

He returned to Holland to play for Telstar in February 2016, only to sign with Maldivian side Club Eagles in February 2017.

References

1988 births
Living people
Footballers from Amsterdam
Association football forwards
Dutch footballers
SC Heerenveen players
K.S.C. Lokeren Oost-Vlaanderen players
Sparta Rotterdam players
CS Concordia Chiajna players
Naft Tehran F.C. players
SC Telstar players
Eredivisie players
Belgian Pro League players
Eerste Divisie players
Liga I players
Dutch expatriate footballers
Dutch expatriate sportspeople in Belgium
Expatriate footballers in Belgium
Dutch expatriate sportspeople in Romania
Expatriate footballers in Romania
Dutch expatriate sportspeople in Iran
Expatriate footballers in Iran
Dutch expatriate sportspeople in the Maldives
Expatriate footballers in the Maldives
Club Eagles players